Mugongo-Manga is one of the communes of Bujumbura Rural Province, located in natural region of Mugamba.

Administration
Mugongo-Manga is divided into 3 zones: Kankima, Ijenda and Mugongo.

Health
The commune of Mugongo-Manga has 2 main hospitals: Ijenda and Rwibaga; there are 2 others health centers in Kankima and Mugongo.

Education
There are 4 high schools in Mugongo-Manga: Kankima (college communal), Ijenda (Lycee), Rwibaga (college communal), and Mugongo (college communal). There are several elementary schools.

References 

Populated places in Burundi